Vietnam competed at the 2008 Summer Paralympics in Beijing. The country was represented by nine athletes, competing in powerlifting, athletics, swimming and judo. Two of the athletes, powerlifters Dinh Thi Nga and Le Van Cong, qualified for the Paralympics through their showings at international competitions, while the other seven team members were given wild card invitations. The head of the delegation was Vu The Phiet. The group left for Beijing following a departure ceremony on August 22 in Hanoi.

Sports

Athletics

Men

Women

Judo

Powerlifting

Men

Women

Swimming

See also
2008 Summer Paralympics
Vietnam at the Paralympics
Vietnam at the 2008 Summer Olympics

External links
Beijing 2008 Paralympic Games Official Site
International Paralympic Committee

References

Nations at the 2008 Summer Paralympics
2008
Paralympics